Halfdan Haneborg Hansen OBE (1 October 1890  – 1974) was a Norwegian military officer, Milorg pioneer and businessman.

Personal life
Haneborg Hansen was born in Kristiania to priest Julius Hansen and Aurora Laurine Haneborg. He was married twice, first to Mimi Blikstad, a daughter of businessman and politician Magnus Blikstad, and in a second marriage to Aagot Marie Jansen. He graduated from the Norwegian Military Academy in 1911, and as chemical engineer from the Karlsruhe Institute of Technology in 1917.

Second World War
During the Norwegian Campaign in 1940, Haneborg Hansen commanded a battalion in Eastern Norway. Later in 1940 he cooperated with Olaf Helset and they established an early resistance organization, which later became part of Milorg. He was arrested in 1941, but escaped from custody in January 1942, and fled to neutral Sweden and then to the United Kingdom. From 1943 he served as military attaché at the Norwegian embassy in London. After the war he was running a business in Oslo.

Awards
Haneborg Hansen was decorated Officer of the French Legion of Honour and Officer of the Order of the British Empire, and received the French Croix de Guerre. He was awarded the Norwegian Defence Medal 1940–1945 and Haakon VII 70th Anniversary Medal, as well as the British Defence Medal.

References

1890 births
1974 deaths
Businesspeople from Oslo
20th-century Norwegian businesspeople
Norwegian Army personnel of World War II
Norwegian resistance members
Norwegian expatriates in the United Kingdom
Norwegian military attachés
Recipients of the Croix de Guerre (France)
Officiers of the Légion d'honneur
Officers of the Order of the British Empire